George Heron (1515 – 7 June 1575), of Chipchase, Northumberland, was an English politician.

He was a Member (MP) of the Parliament of England for Northumberland in 1555.

References

1575 deaths
English MPs 1555
People from Northumberland
1515 births